Sebastián Oscar Rulli ( or , born 6 July 1975) is an actor and model. Born in Argentina, he has spent most of his professional career in Mexico, becoming a dual Argentine and Mexican citizen.

Biography 
Rulli was born in Buenos Aires, the oldest of three children. He studied Business Administration in his native Argentina; however, after completing his studies, he decided to travel to Europe and try his luck in the world of modeling. When moving to Mexico, he entered the Centro de Educación Artística, where he received further training as an actor, although he had already taken acting classes with several teachers in Argentina, Spain and Italy.

Career 
Between 1995 and 1998 the actor began to venture into some telenovelas in Argentina, and later decided to settle in Mexico to study acting at the Centro de Educación Artística de Televisa. His debut on screen was in the year 2000 in the telenovela Primer amor, a mil por hora, followed by Sin pecado concebido, and Clase 406, both melodramas began to position him as one of the most sought after actors. In 2004, the actor starred in the telenovela Rubí, alongside actress Bárbara Mori, a role that would catapult him to international success.

During the following years, Rulli continued working uninterruptedly in telenovelas such as Contra viento y marea, Mundo de fieras, and Pasión. In addition to telenovelas, Rulli has participated in TV series as Mujer, casos de la vida real, Alegrijes y rebujos, Ugly Betty, and Amor mío. In 2008 he starred in the telenovela Un gancho al corazón based on the Argentine telenovela titled Sos mi vida, with Danna García.

The following year he appeared in two episodes of the telenovela Cuando me enamoro, and he starred the telenovela Teresa, with Angelique Boyer, thanks to his performance in this telenovela he received two awards as Best Actor in the New York Latin ACE Awards and the Bravo Awards.

In 2012 he was the co-star of the telenovela produced by Nicandro Díaz González entitled Amores verdaderos, an adaptation of the Argentine telenovela produced in 2005 entitled Amor en custodia. Two years after Teresa, he returned to work with Angelique Boyer, in the telenovela Lo que la vida me robó. This telenovela made him win as Best Lead Actor at the 33rd TVyNovelas Awards. Two years later, he returned to star along with Boyer the telenovela Tres veces Ana, which made him return to win in TVyNovelas Awards as Best Actor.

In 2019, Rulli appeared naked showing his buttocks in photos on the beach. Garbage on the beach could also appear in the images. In this way he tried to raise awareness among his followers about environmental pollution.

In April 2022, he was rumored to star in the James Bond franchise, as the titular character.

Personal life 
Rulli was married to Cecilia Galliano from 2008 to 2011, and with her he had his first child, Santiago. He has been in a relationship with actress Angelique Boyer since 2014.

Filmography

Film

Television

Awards and nominations

TVyNovelas Awards

New York Latin ACE Awards

Premios Juventud

Premios Bravo

People en Español

References

External links

1975 births
Living people
Male actors from Buenos Aires
Argentine male telenovela actors
Argentine male models
20th-century Argentine male actors
21st-century Argentine male actors
Argentine emigrants to Mexico
Naturalized citizens of Mexico
Mexican male telenovela actors
Mexican people of Argentine descent